As Aventuras de Gui & Estopa (also known as Gui & Estopa) is a Flash animated series created by Mariana Caltabiano, and shown on Cartoon Network Brazil. The characters were originally created for a children's website called Iguinho in 1996, which developed a cartoon over the years.

The series is a satire of several cartoons of popular culture, including the Cartoon Network original shows, through slapstick and nonsense comedy. The show is also broadcast by the channel Boomerang and Tooncast in Latin America.

Characters 
Iguinho/Gui – the main character. A very cool dog resembling a West highland white terrier.
Estopa – Gui's best friend. A stupid fat dog who only thinks in food.
Cróquete – Gui's girlfriend. She is a charming Cocker Spaniel.
Pitiburro – Gui's main enemy. An arrogant and coarse Pit bull.
Róquete - a Spaniel who is Cróquete's snooty cousin.

References

External links 
 

2010s Brazilian animated television series
2008 Brazilian television series debuts
Brazilian flash animated television series
Portuguese-language television shows
Animated television series about dogs